The Maryland-National Capital Park and Planning Commission (M-NCPPC) is a bi-county agency that administers parks and planning in Montgomery and Prince George's counties in Maryland.

History
The commission was formed in 1927 by the Maryland General Assembly (Chapter 448, Acts of 1927).  Since 1970, the commission also has operated the Prince George's County recreation program, funded by a separate countywide recreation tax. In addition, the commission provides services and educational programs relating to conservation and nature, local history, and the arts, and offers recreation classes. The commission successfully defended the constitutionality of its maintaining the Blandensburg Peace Cross before the Supreme Court of the United States in American Legion v. American Humanist Association (2019).

Organization and Functions

The commission is divided into seven departments, two for Montgomery county: the Department of Parks and the Department of Planning; two for Prince George's County: the Department of Parks and Recreation and the Department of Planning; and three that are cross-county: the Department of Human Resource Management, the Department of Finance, and the Office of the General Counsel. While these counties and departments are all within one commission, day-to-day operations, for the most part, are separate. Interaction among general staff across counties and departments is rare.

Parks
Within the Maryland-Washington Metropolitan District, the commission is empowered to acquire, develop, maintain, and operate parks systems. In all areas except Laurel, the Commission may spend public funds to acquire park land. Subject to county government approval, it also may sell general obligation bonds to fund park acquisition and development. All other expenses, including debt service, are paid from a park tax levied within the District. 

Prince George's Stadium in Bowie is built on park property.

Planning
Taking into account all factors of urban, suburban, rural and regional planning, the commission prepares and administers a General Plan for the physical development of the Maryland-Washington Regional District. All of Prince George's County (except Laurel) and all of Montgomery County (except Rockville, Gaithersburg, and several small municipalities) are included in the district. For the portion of the district within their county, each planning board makes zoning recommendations to its county council. To enact zoning ordinances and change the zoning map, the planning boards have exclusive responsibility for subdivision approval, location and grades of streets, location of public buildings and utilities, and street naming and house numbering. Administration and operating expenses of the commission are financed by property taxes levied by the two counties.

Park Police
The Commission supervises the Maryland-National Capital Park Police, which patrols the parks in both counties. The M-NCPPC Park Police is divided into the Montgomery County Division and the Prince George's County Division.

Governance
The Commission's ten members include five residents of Montgomery County and five of Prince George's who serve four-year terms. The five members from each county make up the county planning board. In Montgomery County, members are appointed by the County Council and confirmed by the County Executive. In Prince George's County, the County Executive appoints all five members subject to County Council confirmation. Of the members from each county, no more than three may be of the same political party. The appointing authority names the planning board chair. The Commission chair alternates each year between the two planning board chairs. The alternate becomes vice-chair.

The Commission appoints the Executive Director, General Counsel, and Secretary-Treasurer. In Prince George's County, the Parks and Recreation Director and Planning Director are appointed by the County Planning Board. In Montgomery County, the Planning Board appoints a Director of Parks and a Planning Director.

External links

Montgomery County Planning Board
Montgomery County Department of Parks
Montgomery County Planning
Prince George's County Department of Parks and Recreation
Prince George's County Planning Board
Prince George's County Planning Department

References

Prince George's County, Maryland
Montgomery County, Maryland
Metropolitan planning organizations
1927 establishments in Maryland
Local government in Maryland
Organizations established in 1927